iStabilizer manufactures tripods, dollies, monopods, and mounts for use with smartphones, GPS units, and POV cameras. iStabilizer's products are designed to maximize stability and are compatible with most handheld devices. Noah Rasheta is the company's president.

Products and design

Flex
The iStabilizer Flex is a tripod-type attachment for smartphones and small cameras. The three flexible legs work to stabilize the device on the ground, and can also be used to wrap around a post or ledge.

The recording device is attached to the tripod using the iStabilizer Mount, which is compatible with smartphones and GPS units. The Mount XL accommodates widescreen smartphones and tablet devices. Both of the mounting devices use spring-action technology to lock devices in.

Dolly
iStabilizer's Dolly is a smartphone accessory that allows a camera to be attached to an 11 inch long adjustable arm, and a set of four wheels for a mobilized, stabilized video shot. The Dolly cradle can accommodate multiple brands of cameras, and is not limited to mobile devices. The wheel axles can be adjusted, allowing the Dolly to make tight curves or to circle the subject being shot.

The wheels contain ball bearings, which facilitate a smooth, rolling motion. The iStabilizer Dolly is not motorized, and requires the operator to manually move the device.

Monopod
The iStabilizer Monopod is an attachment for smartphones and small cameras which extends from 14 inches to three feet, allowing users to take pictures or video from above and around obstructions.

The Monopod utilizes the same iStabilizer Mount technology to secure the device.

Glass
Utilizing the same iStabilizer Mount technology, the iStabilizer Glass is a smartphone and GPS attachment that secures the device to a car windshield. The Glass attaches to the windshield using a suction cup, and has an adjustable arm that can pivot the screen of the device from driver to passenger.

A study performed by the Advance Motorists and Transport Research Laboratory recently revealed the danger of simultaneous handheld mobile device use and operation a motor vehicle. By freeing the hands and positioning the mobile device at eye level, designs such as the iStabilizer Glass could potentially minimize driver distraction and maximize reaction time.

External links
 iStabilizer.com

References

Companies based in Utah
Photography companies of the United States